Joktan (also written as Yoktan;) was the second of the two sons of Eber (Book of Genesis 10:25; 1 Chronicles 1:19) mentioned in the Hebrew Bible. He descends from Shem, son of Noah.

In the Book of Genesis 10:25 it reads: "And unto Eber were born two sons: the name of one was Peleg; for in his days was the earth divided; and his brother's name was Joktan."

In Pseudo-Philo's account (ca. 70), Joktan was first made prince over the children of Shem, just as Nimrod and Phenech were princes over the children of Ham and Japheth, respectively. In his version, the three princes command all persons to bake bricks for the Tower of Babel; however, twelve, including several of Joktan's own sons, as well as Abraham and Lot, refuse the orders. Joktan smuggles them out of Shinar and into the mountains, to the annoyance of the other two princes.

South Arabian Narrative 
There is an Arab tradition that Joktan was the progenitor of all the purest tribes of Southern Arabia. Joktan has been identified with Qahtān (Arabic: قحطان), the ancestral figure of Qahtanites, in traditional Arab genealogy. Three of Joktan's sons have connections to South Arabia. Sheba is identified as the ancient South Arabian kingdom of Saba. Hazarmaveth (Biblical Hebrew: חֲצַרְמָוֶת, tr. Ḥăṣarmāweṯ; Arabic: حضرموت) has been identified with the South Arabian region of Hadhramaut and according to various Bible dictionaries, the name "Hazarmaveth" means "court of death" which reflects a meaning similar to the Arabic folk etymologies of the region. Hadoram according to Rabbi Aryeh Kaplan is interpreted as denoting "the south" and it was a fortress to the south of Yemen's Sana'a.

Mongoloid Race Theory 
One early proponent of this theory was the theologian Benito Arias Montano, who proposed a link between the names of Ophir, Joktan's son, and Peru.

See also
 Not to be confused with Jokshan
 Qahtanite

References

Book of Genesis people
Books of Chronicles people
Tower of Babel